Platyptilia sochivkoi is a moth of the family Pterophoridae. It is found in Lesotho.

References

sochivkoi
Endemic fauna of Lesotho
Fauna of Lesotho
Moths described in 2011